Derrelle Owens (born June 9, 1981), better known by his stage name Shorty Mack, is a producer, rapper and actor. He is most significantly known by his 1996 single, "Hard To Tame Me", and his self-titled debut album, both released under JVC/Vertex Music. He has since made appearances on numerous recordings by Ray J, including the Knockout remix of "Formal Invite" and the Smokin' Trees version of "What I Need". He also played the role of "Nyce" on the sitcom Moesha. Owens co-created Knockout Entertainment. A full-length album, tentatively titled Shorty Mack, was expected to be released in 2012.

Filmography
 A Day In The Life (2009)
 Welfare to Millionaire (2007)
 Coach Carter (2005)
 JC In The Hood (2006)

TV series 
 Moesha (1999–2001; 13 episodes)
 Boston Public (2004; 1 episode)
 Lincoln Heights(2007; 3 episodes)
 For The Love Of Ray J (2009–2010)
 Brandy and Ray J: A Family Business (2010–2011)

Discography

Studio albums

Singles

Guest appearances

References

External links
 http://myspace.com/officialpurpman
 

Living people
African-American male rappers
1981 births
West Coast hip hop musicians
Rappers from Sacramento, California
21st-century American rappers
21st-century American male musicians
21st-century African-American musicians
20th-century African-American people